Thompson (also known as Zion Hill) is an unincorporated community in Trinity County, Texas. The community has a church and some homes; it once had a school, which opened in the 1880s. It is incorrectly sometimes referred as Brush Prairie, which was a town right beside Zion Hill.

References

Unincorporated communities in Trinity County, Texas
Unincorporated communities in Texas